Aurelio García (born 7 March 1947) is a Spanish alpine skier. He competed at the 1968 Winter Olympics and the 1972 Winter Olympics.

References

1947 births
Living people
Spanish male alpine skiers
Olympic alpine skiers of Spain
Alpine skiers at the 1968 Winter Olympics
Alpine skiers at the 1972 Winter Olympics
Sportspeople from Madrid
20th-century Spanish people